West Derby Cemetery, Lower House Lane, Croxteth. Opened in January 1884 it has been used for Church of England, Roman Catholic and Jewish burials. Various buildings at the cemetery are Grade II listed buildings.

The cemetery contains 108 Commonwealth service war graves of World War I and 129 of World War II, scattered in the different denominational plots.  Marked war graves from the latter war include Czech Battle of Britain veteran Jindrich Bartos (within Roman Catholic section).  Casualties whose graves could not be marked by CWGC headstones are listed on the two denominational Screen Wall memorials.  The CWGC also care for 2 foreign nationals' war graves.

Notable burials
 Hugh Stowell Brown
 Peter Craven
 Tommy Burns

Gallery

See also
 Burial Act 1857

References

External links
 Welcome liverpool-ancestors.co.uk – Justhost.com
 

Grade II listed buildings in Liverpool
Cemeteries in Liverpool
Commonwealth War Graves Commission cemeteries in England
1884 establishments in England